This articles lists cities located along the Silk Road. The Silk Road was a network of ancient trade routes which connected Europe with the Far East, spanning from the Mediterranean Sea to the Korean Peninsula and Japan.

The Silk Road's eastern end is in present-day China, and its main western end is Antioch.  The Silk Road started about the time of the Han Dynasty, when Emperor Wu was ruling.

Along the terrestrial/land Silk Roads 

Major cities, broadly from the eastern Mediterranean to South Asia, and arranged roughly west to east in each area by modern-day country

The Silk Roads across the Middle East and Western Asia 

Turkey
 Constantinople,  ancient Byzantium, (now Istanbul)
 Bursa
 Beypazarı
 Mudurnu
 Taraklı
 Konya
 Adana
 Antioch
 Izmir
 Trabzon

Azerbaijan

 Baku
 Shamakhi
 Barda

Georgia

 Tbilisi (Tiflis)
 Batumi (Batoum)
 Poti

Armenia
Yerevan

Lebanon

 Tyre
Syria
 Aleppo
 Tartus
 Homs
 Damascus
 Palmyra
 Raqqa
 Dura Europos
Iraq
 Mosul
 Erbil
 Samarra
 Fallujah
 Baghdad
 Ctesiphon
 Baquba
Iran
 Tabriz
 Zanjan
 Rasht
 Kermanshah
 Hamadan
 Rey (or Ray in modern-day Tehran)
 Hecatompylos (Damghan)
 Sabzevar
 Nishapur
 Mashhad
 Tus
 Bam
 Yazd
 Qazvin
Qumis (Hekatompylos)

Central Asia 

Turkmenistan
 Nisa
 Merv
 Urgench 
 Amul

Uzbekistan
 Bukhara
 Shahrisabz
 Samarkand
 Tashkent
 Kokand (Fergana Valley)
 Andijon (Fergana Valley)

Tajikistan
 Khujand (Fergana Valley)
 Istaravshan

Kazakhstan
 Otrar
 Ispidjab (or Sairum)
 Taraz
 Hazrat-e Turkestan 
 Almaty

Kyrgyzstan
 Issyk kul
 Tokmok
 Bishkek
 Osh

Southern Routes and South Asia 

Afghanistan
 Bactra (Balkh)
 Herat
 Alexandria Arachosia (Kandahar)
 Bamyan
 Kabul

Pakistan
 Purusapura
 Pushkalavati
 Takshashila
 Multan
 Banbhore/Barbarikon
 Debal/Patala
India
 Tamralipta (or Tamluk)
 Leh
 Jaisalmer
 Mathura
 Varanasi (or Benares)
 Pataliputra

Nepal
 Kathmandu - see also Patan & Bhaktapur
Bangladesh
 Wari-Bateshwar
 Pundranagara
 Vikrampura
 Somapura
 Bhitargarh
 Sonargaon
 Chattagram/Chatgaon/Chittagong
 Comilla/Mainamati/Samatata
 Jahangir Nagar/Dhaka
Bhutan
 Jakar
 Paro

China: The northern route along the Taklamakan Desert 

 Kashgar (or Kashi) (Major City)
 Liqian
 Aksu
 Kucha
 Korla
 Loulan
 Karasahr (Yanqi)
 Turpan (Turfan)
 Jiaohe Ruins
 Turpan Water Museum
 Gaochang
 the Bezeklik Thousand Buddha Caves
 Chang'an
 Kumul/Hami
 Ürümqi 
 Yumen Pass (or Jade Gate or Pass of the Jade Gate) (city called Yumenguan or Hecang)
 Anxi

China: The southern route along the Taklamakan Desert 
 Kashgar (or Kashi) (Major City)
 Pishan
 Khotan
 Niya
 Mingfeng
 Endere
 Charchan
 Waxxari
 Ruoqiang Town (Charklik)
 Miran
 Yangguan, or Yangguan Pass
 Dunhuang
 the Mogao Caves
 Anxi

China: From Anxi/Dunhuang to Chang'an (Xi'an) 

 Dunhuang (Major City)
 Jiayuguan
 Jiuquan
 Zhangye
 Shandan
 Liangzhou (Wuwei)
 Tianzhu, Gansu
 Lanzhou
 Tianshui
 Baoji
 Chang'an (modern-day Xi'an)

The eastern routes 

Korea
 Pyongyang
 Gyeongju
 Busan
 Seoul
Japan
 Nara
 Fukuoka
 Nagasaki
 Osaka

Along the Indian Ocean trade routes 

Pakistan
 Debal
 Barbarikon
 Banbhore

China
Ningbo, China
 Fuzhou, China
 Quanzhou, China
 Guangzhou, China

Korea
 Ulsan, Korea

Bangladesh
 Chittagong, Bangladesh

Sri Lanka
 Colombo, Sri Lanka

India
 Tamralipta, West Bengal, India
 Poompuhar, Tamil Nadu, India
 chennai, Tamil Nadu, India
 Korkai, Tamil Nadu, India
 Muziris, Kerala, India
 Goa, India
 Mumbai, Maharashtra, India
 Cochin, Kerala, India
 Masulipatnam,  Andhra Pradesh, India
 Lothal, Gujarat, India

Ukraine

Sudak, Ukraine

Russia
 Astrakhan, Russia
 Derbent, Russia

Oman
 Muscat, Oman

Yemen
 Aden, Yemen

Somalia
 Bosaso, Somalia

Egypt
 Suez, Egypt

Turkey
 Ayas, Turkey

Italy
 Venice, Italy
 Rome, Italy

In Southeast Asia 

 Kedah (Early history of Kedah)
 Ligor
 Bolinao, Pangasinan, Philippines
 Malacca
 Muziris, India
 Vijaya, Champa
 Hanoi, Vietnam
 Hoi An, Vietnam
 Perlak, Indonesia

List of Ptolemy 

This following list is attributed to Ptolemy.  All city names are Ptolemy's, throughout all his works.  Most of the names are included in Geographia.

Some of the cities provided by Ptolemy either: no longer exist today or have moved to different locations.
Nevertheless, Ptolemy has provided an important historical reference for researchers.

(This list has been alphabetized.)

 Africa
East Africa - Akhmim, Aromaton Emporion, Axum, Coloe, Dongola, Juba, Maji, Opone, Panopolis, Sarapion, Sennar.
North Africa - Caesarea, Carthage, Cyrene, Leptis Magna, Murzuk, Sijilmassa, Tamanrasset, Tingis.
 Arabia - Cane, Eudaemon Arabia, Mocha, Mosylon, Sanaʽa, Zafār (Saphar), Saue.
 Bangladesh - Sounagaora.
 China - Cattigara, Chengdu, Kaifeng, Kitai, Kunming, Yarkand.
 Europe - Aquileia, Athens, Augusta Treverorum (Trier), Gades (Cadiz), Ostia.
 India - Argaru, Astakapra, Bacare, Balita, Barake, Byzantion, Colchi, Erannoboas, Horaia, Kalliena, Mandagora, Melizeigara, Muziris, korkai, Poompuhar, Naura, Nelcynda, Paethana (Paithan), Palaepatmae, Palaesimundu, Poduca, Semylla, Sopatma, Suppara (Nalasopara), Tagara, Tymdis.
 Pakistan - Barbaricum, Peshawer, Taxilla
 Persia - Alexandria Areion, Kandahar, Persepolis.
 Persian Gulf - Apologos, Asabon, Charax, Gerrha (or Gerra), Ommana.
 Red Sea - Adulis, Aualites, Berenica, Malao, ancient Berbera, Muza, Myos Hormos, Ocalis, Ptolemais Theron.
 Southeast Asia - Kattigara (Oc Eo), Thaton, Trang. 
 Unknown - Ecbatana  (located in either modern Iran or Syria), Jiaohei.

References

Silk Road
!